Ethereal Tomb is the third and final full-length studio album from Florida death metal band, Nocturnus. It was released in 1999 on Season of Mist Records after nearly seven years since the band's last material, the Nocturnus EP was released. Emo Mowery had taken up vocal duties as well as bass, and Rick Bizarro played the drums.

A compilation album of early Nocturnus demos was released in 2004. However, this album remains their final studio outing to date.

Track listing

Credits
Nocturnus
 Emo Mowery - vocals, bass guitar
 Mike Davis - lead guitar, rhythm guitar
 Sean McNenney - lead guitar, rhythm guitar
 Louie Panzer - keyboards
 Rick Bizarro - drums, percussion

Production
 Recorded in 1999 at Audio Lab Studios, Tampa, Florida, USA
 Produced by Greg Marchak and Nocturnus
 Engineered by Greg Marchak

References

External links
Season of Mist album page
Discogs album entry
Encyclopaedia Metallum album entry
BNR Metal discography page
Nocturnus fan site

1999 albums
Nocturnus albums
Season of Mist albums